Marika Lindström (born 25 November 1946) is a Swedish actress who has appeared in numerous films in her native Sweden as well as appearing in TV shows such as Emma åklagare and Tre kärlekar. Marika Lindström has long been a part of the ensemble at Stockholm City Theatre and is married to a Swedish actor, Ingvar Hirdwall. She acts in Vår tid är nu which is broadcast on SVT since 2017.

References

External links

Swedish actresses
1946 births
Living people